William Wright (October 29, 1853 – January 3, 1926) was a Canadian politician.

Born in Egremont Township, Grey County, Canada West, the son of David Wright, Irish, and his wife, Susanna Foster, English, Wright was educated in the Public School of Egremont. He was a blacksmith, general merchant, and a general agent. He was Councillor and Reeve of the Township of Chaffey, also Councillor and Reeve of the Town of Huntsville, Ontario. He was first elected to the House of Commons of Canada for the riding of Muskoka in the 1904 federal election. A Conservative, he was re-elected in 1908 and 1911.

A Methodist, he married Mary Elizabeth Quirt on October 23, 1878.

References
 The Canadian Parliament; biographical sketches and photo-engravures of the senators and members of the House of Commons of Canada. Being the tenth Parliament, elected November 3, 1904

External links
 

1853 births
1926 deaths
Canadian Methodists
Conservative Party of Canada (1867–1942) MPs
Members of the House of Commons of Canada from Ontario
People from Grey County